Vitex peduncularis is a species of plant in the family Lamiaceae. It is found in Southeast and South Asia, including in China (southern Yunnan), Cambodia, Bangladesh, India, Laos, Myanmar, Nepal, Thailand, and Vietnam.

References

peduncularis